"Chinese Bitch" is an EP released in 1994 by Dee Dee Ramone I.C.L.C. It was recorded February 1994 in Tegelen, the Netherlands, and released in April through Rough Trade Records/World Services GmbH.

Track listing
"Chinese Bitch" (Dee Dee Ramone, Andy Shernoff)
"I Don't Wanna Get Involved with You" (Dee Dee Ramone)
"That's What Everybody Else Does" (Dee Dee Ramone, Daniel Rey)
"We're a Creepy Family" (Dee Dee Ramone, John Carco)

Personnel
 Dee Dee Ramone – guitar, vocals
 Johnny Carco – bass
 Danny Arnold Lommen – drums
 Gert-Jan 'Joe' Van Avesaath – producer
 Terry Richardson – photography

1994 EPs
Dee Dee Ramone albums

pl:Chinese Bitch